Wiradech Kothny (born 10 May 1979) is a Thai former fencer. He won bronze medals in the individual and team sabre events at the 2000 Summer Olympics, competing for Germany. He then competed for Thailand at the 2004 and 2008 Summer Olympics.

References

External links
 

1979 births
Living people
German male sabre fencers
Wiradech Kothny
Olympic fencers of Germany
Wiradech Kothny
Fencers at the 2000 Summer Olympics
Fencers at the 2004 Summer Olympics
Fencers at the 2008 Summer Olympics
Olympic bronze medalists for Germany
Olympic medalists in fencing
Asian Games medalists in fencing
Medalists at the 2000 Summer Olympics
Fencers at the 2002 Asian Games
Fencers at the 2006 Asian Games
Fencers at the 2010 Asian Games
Wiradech Kothny
Wiradech Kothny
Medalists at the 2006 Asian Games
Southeast Asian Games medalists in fencing
Wiradech Kothny
Wiradech Kothny
Wiradech Kothny
Competitors at the 2005 Southeast Asian Games